Handy may refer to:

 Handy, the term for mobile phone in German-speaking countries
 Handy (company), an American cleaning and home services firm
 Handy, an emulator for the Atari Lynx, also a development name of Lynx itself

Places

United States
 Handy, Georgia
 Handy, Benton County, Indiana
 Handy, Monroe County, Indiana
 Handy, Missouri
 Handy Township, Michigan
 Handy, North Carolina

Elsewhere
 Handy Cross, Buckinghamshire, England

People 
 Handy (surname)
 Jack Handey, American comedian

Entertainment 
 Handy Awards, named after W. C. Handy, which were renamed the Blues Music Awards in 2006.
 Handy Smurf, a character from The Smurfs
 Handy (Happy Tree Friends), character from Happy Tree Friends
 Handy (magazine), owned by North American Membership Group
 "Handy" (song), recorded by "Weird Al" Yankovic in 2014

See also 
 Handy Andy (disambiguation)
 Handy Board
 Handy Man (disambiguation)
 Handy Writers' Colony
 Handy class destroyer
 Handycam